Sandesneben is a village in the district of Lauenburg, in Schleswig-Holstein, Germany. It is situated approximately 18 km west of Ratzeburg, and 25 km southwest of Lübeck.

Sandesneben is the seat of the Amt ("collective municipality") Sandesneben-Nusse.

References

Further reading
Gemeinde Sandesneben (in German)
Rohrreinigung Sandesneben (in German)
Lieferservice (in German)
Zuständigkeiten (in German)
Abflussreinigung (in German)
Rohrreinigung Duisburg (in German)

Herzogtum Lauenburg